Steven Douglas Israel (born March 16, 1969) is a former American football cornerback.

Career
Israel grew up in Lawnside, New Jersey and played high school football at Haddon Heights High School.

He played college football at the University of Pittsburgh and was selected first in the second round of the 1992 NFL Draft. He played in the NFL for the Los Angeles Rams, the San Francisco 49ers, the New England Patriots, the New Orleans Saints, and the Carolina Panthers. After ten years in the NFL, Israel is now a college football analyst on ESPNU, Fox Sports and has appeared on some local networks.

Israel founded the EndZone Luncheon Series and created the Gridiron Luncheon Series in Charlotte.

Personal life
Israel received a BA in economics from the University of Pittsburgh and received business qualifications from the Stanford Graduate School of Business and from Harvard Business School.

In recognition for his contributions to football, Israel was inducted into the Camden County, New Jersey Hall Of Fame and the South Jersey Coaches Hall Of Fame.

Israel is currently married to Lorae Israel and has four children.

References

1969 births
Living people
Haddon Heights Junior/Senior High School alumni
Players of American football from Camden, New Jersey
People from Lawnside, New Jersey
American football cornerbacks
Los Angeles Rams players
San Francisco 49ers players
New England Patriots players
New Orleans Saints players
Pittsburgh Panthers football players